Jean Vallette d'Osia (16 August 1898 - 28 February 2000) was a French officer best known for his action in the French Resistance during World War II in Haute-Savoie, notably supervising the liberation of Lyon. 

He ended his career in 1958 with the rank of Général de corps d'armée after having commanded the 27th Mountain Infantry Brigade. 

Vallette d'Osia was also a staunch anti-communist and in later life linked to the far-right National Front.

Honours
Grand Croix de la Légion d'honneur (1978)
Croix de guerre 1914-1918
Croix de guerre 1939-1945
Médaille de la Résistance

References

French Resistance members
French anti-communists
French centenarians
Men centenarians
1898 births
2000 deaths
Recipients of the Croix de Guerre (France)
Recipients of the Resistance Medal
French military personnel of World War I
French military personnel of World War II
École Spéciale Militaire de Saint-Cyr alumni
French generals
Grand Croix of the Légion d'honneur